Eugeni Leonidovitsch Redkine (born 2 February 1970 in Khanty-Mansiysk), known as Eugeni Redkine (also transliterated Evgeni Redkin or Yevgeny Redkin), is a former Russian biathlete.
He won a surprising gold medal over 20 kilometres ahead of Mark Kirchner and Mikael Löfgren at the 1992 Winter Olympics.

References

External links
 
 

1970 births
Living people
Russian male biathletes
Olympic biathletes of the Unified Team
Olympic biathletes of Belarus
Biathletes at the 1992 Winter Olympics
Biathletes at the 1994 Winter Olympics
Olympic gold medalists for the Unified Team
People from Khanty-Mansiysk
Olympic medalists in biathlon
Biathlon World Championships medalists
Medalists at the 1992 Winter Olympics
Sportspeople from Khanty-Mansi Autonomous Okrug